Caloptilia deltosticta is a moth of the family Gracillariidae. It is known from India  (Jammu and Kashmir) and Pakistan.

The larvae feed on Lonicera quinquelocularis. They mine the leaves of their host plant.

References

deltosticta
Moths of Asia
Moths described in 1933